Alfred Johannes Bäck (1 September 1872 - 22 March 1952) was a Finnish Lutheran clergyman and politician. He was a member of the Parliament of Finland from 1907 to 1913 and again from 1916 to 1919, representing the Swedish People's Party of Finland (SFP). He was born in Lappajärvi, and was the elder brother of Immanuel Bäck.

References

1872 births
1952 deaths
People from Lappajärvi
People from Vaasa Province (Grand Duchy of Finland)
20th-century Finnish Lutheran clergy
Swedish People's Party of Finland politicians
Members of the Parliament of Finland (1907–08)
Members of the Parliament of Finland (1908–09)
Members of the Parliament of Finland (1909–10)
Members of the Parliament of Finland (1910–11)
Members of the Parliament of Finland (1911–13)
Members of the Parliament of Finland (1916–17)
Members of the Parliament of Finland (1917–19)
People of the Finnish Civil War (White side)
University of Helsinki alumni